Beth Cobden (3 February 1993) is an England netball international. She was a member of the England teams that won gold medals at the 2017 Fast5 Netball World Series and the 2018 Commonwealth Games. At club level, she was a member of the Northern Thunder/Manchester Thunder teams that won Netball Superleague titles in 2012 and 2014. She also played in two grand finals for Loughborough Lightning which won their first ever Superleague title in 2021. In 2019 she signed for Adelaide Thunderbirds of Suncorp Super Netball.

Early life, family and education
Cobden is the daughter of Ian and Pat Cobden. She was raised in Staffordshire, living in Heath Hayes and Lichfield and attending Five Ways Primary School in Cannock. Her older brother, Jack Cobden, is a former England under-20 rugby union international who subsequently represented Romania at senior level. Another brother, Joe Cobden, represented England at under-18 level.

Cobden was introduced to netball by her mother. She subsequently began playing for local clubs, Newhall and Parkside. The Sutton Coldfield–based Parkside club also produced players like Ama Agbeze and Layla Guscoth. Between 2011 and 2015 Cobden attended the University of Manchester where she gained a BA in Accounting and Finance. Together with Helen Housby, she also represented Manchester in BUCS intervarsity netball competitions.

Playing career

Manchester Thunder
Between 2011 and 2015 Cobden played for Northern Thunder/Manchester Thunder. She was a member of the Thunder teams that won Netball Superleague titles in 2012 and 2014.

Loughborough Lightning
Between 2016 and 2018 Cobden played for Loughborough Lightning. She was a member of the Lightning team that won the 2017 British Fast5 Netball All-Stars Championship. She also played for Lightning in the 2017 and 2018 Netball Superleague grand finals. In the 2018 final Cobden suffered an anterior cruciate ligament injury and was taken off after just 14 minutes. On 27 June 2021, she and the Loughborough Lightning squad won their first netball superleague title  Beth rejoined Loughborough lightning in 2021 after returning from a 3rd ACL rupture injury. She was won the super league title with Loughborough in 2021 and was named player of the year and player of the match in the grand final. In 2022 she was unable to play in the final few rounds of the league and the grand final due to a injury to her calf but was still named in the vitality all star V11 as the Wing Defence

Adelaide Thunderbirds
In 2019 Cobden signed for Adelaide Thunderbirds of Suncorp Super Netball. However in a round three match against Melbourne Vixens she again suffered an anterior cruciate ligament injury and subsequently missed the rest of season. Cobden was not included in the Thunderbirds 2020 squad 
 but was subsequently included in the Southern Force 2020 squad.

International
Great Britain
Cobden was a member of the Great Britain team that won the gold medal at the 2012 World University Netball Championship.

England
Cobden made her senior debut for England in 2016. In June 2016 she was given a full-time contract by England Netball. She was subsequently a member of the England teams that won gold medals at the 2017 Fast5 Netball World Series and the 2018 Commonwealth Games. Cobden missed the 2018–19 international season, including the 2019 Netball World Cup because of injuries.

 she was selected to represent England in the 2022 home commonwealth games in Birmingham but was unfortunately ruled out due to a calf injury she suffered during her season with Loughborough Lightning and was unable to be fully fit in time

Coach
While playing for Loughborough Lightning, Cobden and her team mates, Hannah Joseph and Natalie Panagarry coached at Ratcliffe College. While playing with Adelaide Thunderbirds she worked as a youth coach for Netball South Australia.

Honours
England
Commonwealth Games
Winners: 2018: 1
Fast5 Netball World Series
Winners: 2017: 1
Netball Quad Series
Runners Up: 2018 (Jan): 1
Great Britain
World University Netball Championship
Winners: 2012: 1
Northern Thunder/Manchester Thunder
Netball Superleague
Winners: 2012, 2014: 2
Loughborough Lightning
Netball Superleague
Runners up: 2017, 2018: 2
British Fast5 Netball All-Stars Championship
Winners: 2017: 1

References

1993 births
Living people
English netball players
English netball coaches
Manchester Thunder players
Loughborough Lightning netball players
Netball Superleague players
Adelaide Thunderbirds players
Suncorp Super Netball players
Australian Netball League players
Southern Force (netball) players
English expatriate netball people in Australia
Netball players at the 2018 Commonwealth Games
Commonwealth Games medallists in netball
Commonwealth Games gold medallists for England
Sportspeople from Staffordshire
Alumni of the University of Manchester
Medallists at the 2018 Commonwealth Games